France competed at the 2014 Summer Youth Olympics, in Nanjing, China from 16 August to 28 August 2014.

Medalists
Medals awarded to participants of mixed-NOC (Combined) teams are represented in italics. These medals are not counted towards the individual NOC medal tally.

Archery

France qualified two archers from its performance at the 2013 World Archery Youth Championships.

Individual

Team

Athletics

France qualified 18 athletes.

Qualification Legend: Q=Final A (medal); qB=Final B (non-medal); qC=Final C (non-medal); qD=Final D (non-medal); qE=Final E (non-medal)

Boys
Track & road events

Field Events

Girls
Track & road events

Field events

Badminton

France qualified two athletes based on the 2 May 2014 BWF Junior World Rankings.

Singles

Doubles

Basketball

France qualified a boys' team from their performance at the 2013 U18 3x3 World Championships.

Skills Competition

Boys' Tournament

Roster
 Teddy Cheremond
 Lucas Dussoulier
 Élie Fedensieu
 Karim Mouliom

Group stage

Knockout Stage

Beach volleyball

France qualified a boys' and girls' team from their performance at the 2014 CEV Youth Continental Cup Final.

Boxing

France qualified one boxer based on its performance at the 2014 AIBA Youth World Championships

Girls

Canoeing

France qualified four boats based on its performance at the 2013 World Junior Canoe Sprint and Slalom Championships.

Boys

Girls

Diving

France qualified two divers based on its performance at the Nanjing 2014 Diving Qualifying Event.

Fencing

France qualified two athletes based on its performance at the 2014 FIE Cadet World Championships.

Boys

Girls

Mixed Team

Golf

France qualified one team of two athletes based on the 8 June 2014 IGF Combined World Amateur Golf Rankings.

Individual

Team

Gymnastics

Artistic Gymnastics

France qualified one athlete based on its performance at the 2014 European MAG Championships and another athlete based on its performance at the 2014 European WAG Championships.

Boys

Girls

Trampoline

France qualified one athlete based on its performance at the 2014 European Trampoline Championships.

Judo

France qualified two athletes based on its performance at the 2013 Cadet World Judo Championships.

Individual

Team

Modern Pentathlon

France qualified one athlete based on its performance at the 2014 Youth A World Championships and another based on the 1 June 2014 Olympic Youth A Pentathlon World Rankings.

Rowing

France qualified two boats based on its performance at the 2013 World Rowing Junior Championships.

Qualification Legend: FA=Final A (medal); FB=Final B (non-medal); FC=Final C (non-medal); FD=Final D (non-medal); SA/B=Semifinals A/B; SC/D=Semifinals C/D; R=Repechage

Rugby Sevens

France qualified a boys' team based on its performance at the 2013 Rugby World Cup Sevens.

Boys' Tournament

Roster

 Alex Arrate
 Faraj Fartass
 Alex Gracbling
 Alexandre Lagarde
 Martin Laveau
 Alexandre Nicque
 Alexandre Pilati
 Arthur Retière
 Alexandre Roumat
 Atila Septar
 Sacha Valleau
 Matthieu Voisin

Group stage

Semifinal

Gold-medal match

Sailing

France qualified one boat based on its performance at the 2013 World Techno 293 Championships. Later France qualified two boats based on its performance at the Byte CII European Continental Qualifiers and one boat from the Techno 293 European Continental Qualifiers.

Shooting

France qualified one shooter based on its performance at the 2014 European Shooting Championships.

Individual

Team

Swimming

France qualified eight swimmers.

Boys

Girls

Mixed

Table Tennis

France qualified two athletes based on its performance at the European Qualification Event.

Singles

Team

Qualification Legend: Q=Main Bracket (medal); qB=Consolation Bracket (non-medal)

Taekwondo

France qualified two athletes based on its performance at the Taekwondo Qualification Tournament.

Boys

Triathlon

France qualified one athlete based on its performance at the 2014 European Youth Olympic Games Qualifier.

Individual

Relay

Weightlifting

France qualified 1 quota in the boys' events based on the team ranking after the 2014 Weightlifting Youth European Championships.

Boys

Wrestling

France qualified one athlete based on its performance at the 2014 European Cadet Championships.

Girls

References

2014 in France
Nations at the 2014 Summer Youth Olympics
France at the Youth Olympics